"Read 'Em and Weep" is a rock music song composed by Jim Steinman. It was originally written for Meat Loaf and recorded for his 1981 album, Dead Ringer, the second of only two tracks on the album produced by Steinman and Jimmy Iovine.

Barry Manilow version
"Read 'Em and Weep" did not become a hit until late 1983, when a slightly rewritten version was recorded by Barry Manilow as one of three new tracks on his compilation album, Greatest Hits, Vol. II. This version featured new lyrics for the second half of the song’s second verse, as well as slight changes in the first verse and final chorus. It was a chart topping success, hitting #1 on the Canadian and U.S. Adult Contemporary charts for six weeks, as well as peaking at number #18 on the U.S. Billboard Hot 100 in the first weeks of 1984.

Chart performance

See also
List of number-one adult contemporary singles of 1983 (U.S.)

References

1981 songs
1981 singles
1983 singles
Barry Manilow songs
Meat Loaf songs
Songs written by Jim Steinman
Song recordings produced by Jimmy Iovine
Song recordings produced by Jim Steinman
Arista Records singles
Rock ballads
Song recordings with Wall of Sound arrangements